Claude Selveratnam  was a popular radio announcer of Radio Ceylon - the oldest radio station in South Asia. Selveratnam read the English news bulletins of Radio Ceylon as well as presenting some of the popular radio programs of the day such as - 'Holiday Choice'.

He joined a select band of Radio Ceylon announcers who enjoyed iconic status in South Asia in the 1950s and 1960s.  Millions of listeners tuned into hear announcers like Claude Selveratnam.

See also
Radio Ceylon
Sri Lanka Broadcasting Corporation
List of Sri Lankan broadcasters

References

Bibliography 
 Wavell, Stuart. - The Art of Radio - Training Manual written by the Director Training of the CBC. - Ceylon Broadcasting Corporation, 1969.

External links
Sri Lanka Broadcasting Corporation
Vernon Corea The Golden Voice of Radio Ceylon
 SLBC-creating new waves of history
Eighty Years of Broadcasting in Sri Lanka

Sri Lankan Tamil radio personalities
Sri Lankan Tamil broadcasters
Year of birth missing